Tang-e Vashi (Persian: تنگ واشی) is a gorge and mountain pass in the Alborz range of Iran (Persia). It is a popular tourist attraction in Tehran Province.

Located 15 kilometres west of Firouzkouh, 9 kilometres north of the Firouzkouh-Damavand road in Tehran Province, it is a narrow mountain pass in the Alborz range. The narrow gorge was created by a perennial stream  which comes down from a series of waterfalls upstream.

Slightly lower, in a hilly area, the stream provided a patch of lush grazing land within the mountains. Until the 20th century the area was a royal hunting reserve, populated by various wildlife. The Qajar Persia king Fath Ali Shah (1772 – 1834) maintained a hunting lodge there.

To commemorate his hunts, Fath Ali Shah ordered the carving of a rock relief in the mid way point of the pass, emulating Sassanian examples. There are ruins of a Qajar guard tower at the top of one of entrances to the gorge.

Today, the relief is a popular tourist attraction and the location is also highly popular among trekking and hiking fans.

Tang-e Vashi has private land owner since 1897 and it has  belonged to Haji Esfandiyar Hamedi sangesari, Ali agha Hamedi Esfandiyari and his son Siamak Hamedi and family since 1996.

Gallery

See also
Damavand city
Rudehen
Fath Ali Shah Qajar
Nassereddin Shah relief

External links

 Photos of Firuzkooh Road

Landforms of Iran
Tourist attractions in Tehran Province
Mountain passes of Iran
Canyons and gorges of Asia
Landforms of Tehran Province
Firuzkuh County
Rock reliefs in Iran